Veronica Cartwright (born April 20, 1949) is a British-born American actress. She is known for appearing in science fiction and horror films, and has earned numerous accolades, including three Primetime Emmy Award nominations. Her younger sister is actress Angela Cartwright.

As a child actress, she appeared in supporting roles in The Children's Hour and The Birds, the latter of which was Cartwright's first commercial success. She made her transition into mainstream, mature roles with 1978's Invasion of the Body Snatchers. The following year, she played Lambert in the science-fiction horror film Alien, which earned her recognition and a Saturn Award for Best Supporting Actress. She additionally appeared in the films The Right Stuff and The Witches of Eastwick which earned her praise, and in the 1990s, received three nominations for the Primetime Emmy Award for Outstanding Guest Actress in a Drama Series, one of which was for her role on ER and two of which were for her role in The X-Files.

Early life
Cartwright was born in Bristol and grew up in Los Angeles, having emigrated to the US shortly after the birth of her younger sister, actress Angela Cartwright.

Career
In 1958, her career as a child actress began with a role in In Love and War.  Among her early appearances were repeated roles in the television series Leave It to Beaver (as Beaver's classmates Violet Rutherford and, later, Peggy MacIntosh) and episodes of One Step Beyond "The Haunting" (1960) and The Twilight Zone "I Sing the Body Electric" (1962). In 1963, she guest starred twice in NBC's medical drama about psychiatry, The Eleventh Hour, in the episodes "The Silence of Good Men" and "My Name is Judith, I'm Lost, You See". Cartwright appeared in the films The Children's Hour (1961) and Alfred Hitchcock's The Birds (1963), which were both highly successful. In The Birds, she was cast along with her television father from Leave It to Beaver, Richard Deacon, although the two were not on screen together. She appeared in Spencer's Mountain (1963) with Henry Fonda and Kym Karath. She played daughter Jemima Boone in the first two seasons of NBC's Daniel Boone from 1964 until 1966, with co-stars Fess Parker, Patricia Blair, Darby Hinton, Ed Ames and Dallas McKennon. She won a regional Emmy Award for the television movie Tell Me Not in Mournful Numbers (1964). She achieved adult success with film roles in Inserts (1974), Goin' South (1978), and Invasion of the Body Snatchers (1978).

Cartwright's breakout feature was the science-fiction horror film Alien (1979), for which she was originally cast as Aliens heroine Ellen Ripley, but director Ridley Scott instead set her to play Lambert prior to shooting. The infamous chestburster scene in the film featured a genuine reaction from Cartwright, who had not been informed beforehand that blood would be involved; co-star Tom Skerritt confirmed this by saying "What you saw on camera was the real response. She had no idea what the hell happened. All of a sudden this thing just came up." She won the Saturn Award for Best Supporting Actress for her performance.

Her subsequent film roles include The Right Stuff (1983), Flight of the Navigator (1986), The Witches of Eastwick (1987), Money Talks (1997), Scary Movie 2 (2001), Kinsey (2004) and Straight-Jacket (2004). She was nominated again for the Saturn Award for Best Supporting Actress for The Witches of Eastwick.

A frequent performer in television, she has played guest roles in such series as Route 66, Leave it to Beaver, The Mod Squad, Miami Vice, Baywatch, L.A. Law, ER, The X-Files, Chicago Hope, Will & Grace, Touched by an Angel, Judging Amy, Six Feet Under, The Closer, and Law & Order: Special Victims Unit. Cartwright has received three Emmy Award nominations, one for her work in ER in 1997, and two for her work on The X-Files in 1998 and 1999. Cartwright also starred as Mrs. Olive Osmond in the made-for-TV film Inside the Osmonds.

She co-starred in the fourth version of Invasion of the Body Snatchers, The Invasion (2007). She appears on the cover art for the Scissor Sisters' 2006 single "I Don't Feel Like Dancin'" and on their second album Ta-Dah. In 2014, Cartwright reprised her role as Joan Lambert for DLC episodes in Alien: Isolation based on the original film, and appeared in the remake of The Town That Dreaded Sundown. She played the role of Sibley Gamble, a psychic on General Hospital, between July 8, 2019, and July 16, 2019.

Cartwright's many theatre credits include Electra, Talley's Folly, The Bat and The Master Builder, for which she received brilliant reviews. Her performances in The Hands of its Enemy, The Triplet Collection and Homesteaders brought her Drama-Logue Awards for Best Actress.

Filmography

Film

Television

Video games

Awards and nominations

References

Further reading
 Alien (The Director's Cut) : DVD 20th Century Fox 2006. ASIN: B00011V8IQ UPC: 024543098508. Interview with Veronica Cartwright

External links

 
 Veronica Cartwright interview at Classic Film & TV Cafe
 
 
 

1949 births
Living people
20th-century American actresses
21st-century American actresses
American child actresses
American film actresses
American television actresses
American voice actresses
English child actresses
English film actresses
English television actresses
English voice actresses
English emigrants to the United States
Actresses from Bristol
20th-century English women
20th-century English people
21st-century English women
21st-century English people
American people of British descent